Chandamama Kathalu: Volume 1 is a 2014 Indian Telugu-language anthology film directed by Praveen Sattaru and produced by Chanakya Bhooneti. The film has eight sub-stories revolving around love. 
The lives of the central characters in the sub-plots get intertwined with each other. The film features an ensemble cast including Kishore, Lakshmi Manchu, Naga Shourya, Aamani, Naresh, Krishnudu, Chaitanya Krishna, Abhijeet, Vennela Kishore, Amitha Rao and Richa Panai.

Mickey J Meyer composed the music. The shooting was wrapped up in December 2013. The film was released on 25 April 2014 to wide critical acclaim. The film bagged the National Film Award for Best Feature Film in Telugu for the year 2014  while Lakshmi Manchu won her Filmfare Award for Best Supporting Actress - Telugu for her work in the film.

Plot
Saaradhi  is a writer and a widower. His little daughter is suffering from a chronic ailment and he desperately needs 5 lacs. He starts writing a novel with seven different story lines, all inspired from his surroundings. Lisa Smith is a super model near the end of her career with no money left. Venkateshwara Rao is a bachelor desperate to get married, whose only aim in life is to find a(ny) girl. Soumya Bollapragada is seen in a short and special role as the girl who falls for Krishnudu.  Ashraf has a small department store in old city and want to marry his sweetheart Haseena. Raghu studies in a junior college and he lures Renu  - daughter of a noted politician in love. There is a beggar  whose lifetime ambition is to buy a small house. Saritha  is a widow who reconnects with her college-time friend Mohan  a NRI divorcee who returns to India. Raju is a typical village youngster who is busy chasing a girl Gauri.

Haseena gets a marriage proposal, from a well off guy living in Dubai. She betrays Ashraf and marries the Dubai guy - before she even sees him, based on a photograph of him - and sets off to Dubai, which leaves Ashraf heartbroken. There she finds that her husband is way older than the photograph shows and works as a taxi driver. Raghu turns out to be fraud, who plans to trap Renu for her money. He convinces Renu to elope with him, But before he could get done with his plan, her father learns of this and apparently has him killed. Raju, one night, sneaks into Gauri's home, but gets caught. He is then forced to marry her by their families, owing to social pressure. He sets off to the city, where he works in the municipality. Gauri delivers a baby, but dies during childbirth unable to bear the pain, because she isn't even sixteen years old. Then he starts taking care of her daughter. Saritha and Mohan, who were unable to get married during their teenage finally make good of their second opportunity. They decide to spend the rest of their lives together and set off for a Road Trip. Krishneshwar Rao saves 10 lacs from his begging income - which he stores at various locations in the city in small amounts - and strikes a deal for a house. But he dies in sleep, the night before he could buy the house. Depressed, Lisa and Venkateshwara Rao, both go to the same bar. They are later shown to be married.

Saaradhi finishes his story and goes to a publisher seeking the money only to find that he is out of town. He then finds Krishneshwara Rao's bag with 10 lacs and has his daughter cured. He gives the remaining amount to Gauri's husband to take care of his own daughter.

Cast

 Kishore as Saarathi 
 Lakshmi Manchu as Lisa Smith
 Naga Shourya as Raju
 Aamani as Saritha
 Naresh as Mohan
 Krishnudu as Venkateswara Rao
 Chaitanya Krishna as Raghu
 Abhijeeth Poondla as Ashraf
 Varshini Sounderajan as Renu
 Richa Panai as Haseena
 Vennela Kishore as Manager of Lisa
 Amitha Rao as Gowri
 Varshini as Renu
 Krishneswara Rao as The Beggar
 Babloo Prithviraj as DK
 Kondavalasa Lakshmana Rao
 Narasimharaju
 Gundu Sudarshan as an astrologer
 Pavala Syamala
 Surekha Vani
 Duvvasi Mohan
 Rocket Raghava
 Jenny
 Surya
 Jabardast Naveen
 Giridhar
 Soumya Bollapragada (special appearance)

Soundtrack
The music was composed by Mickey J. Meyer.

References

External links
 

2014 films
2010s Telugu-language films
Indian anthology films
Films scored by Mickey J Meyer
Best Telugu Feature Film National Film Award winners
Films directed by Praveen Sattaru